The Borrodale Viaduct is a railway viaduct that carries the West Highland Line over the Borrodale Burn.

History

In the decade after Borrodale was constructed, a large number of other concrete bridges were put up, whereas in the five years prior there were only three.

Design
The original proposal was to have a conventional viaduct with piers in the gully, but the owner of Arisaig House insisted that the piers be clad in granite, so the design with the large span was settled on instead. The side spans are clad in dressed stone and are both of span . There is also a dressed stone parapet.

To the south-east, towards Fort William, is a tunnel almost adjacent to the viaduct.

References

Sources
 

Railway bridges in Scotland
Listed bridges in Scotland
Lochaber
Category A listed buildings in Highland (council area)
Bridges in Highland (council area)
Bridges completed in 1901
1901 establishments in Scotland